Arctostaphylos refugioensis is a species of manzanita, known by the common name Refugio manzanita. It is endemic to Santa Barbara County, California, where it can be found along the immediate coastline, including the vicinity of Refugio State Beach, and into the Santa Ynez Mountains of the northwestern Transverse Ranges.

Description
Arctostaphylos refugioensis is a plant of the coastal sage and chaparral on sandstone soils.

Its branches are covered in long, gland-tipped bristles and a dense foliage of oblong greenish to deep red leaves. Each leaf is dull, waxy, and often bristly in texture, smooth or toothed along the edges, and up to 4.5 centimeters long.

The shrub flowers in winter in inflorescences of cone-shaped manzanita flowers each up to a centimeter long. The fruit is a spherical to oval red drupe with a pointed end, measuring at least a centimeter long.

See also
California chaparral and woodlands — ecoregion.
California coastal sage and chaparral — subregion.
California montane chaparral and woodlands — subregion.

References

External links
Jepson Manual Treatment — Arctostaphylos refugioensis
USDA Plants Profile for Arctostaphylos refugioensis
Arctostaphylos refugioensis — U.C. CalPhoto gallery

refugioensis
Endemic flora of California
Natural history of the California chaparral and woodlands
Natural history of Santa Barbara County, California
Natural history of the Transverse Ranges
Santa Ynez Mountains
Plants described in 1967